Bloodhound Mystery is a novel series published by the London firm of T.V. Boardman Ltd. (Boardman Books) between 1948 and 1967. There were two sub-series, American Bloodhound Mysteries and British Bloodhound Mysteries. Both series saw the original hardcover editions of many important works of detective/crime fiction. British artist Denis McLoughlin served as art director for Boardman Books and provided many of the dust jacket illustrations.

Sources
Gore, Matthew H. "Collector's Corner: Denis McLoughlin," Goldenage Treasury Volume One. AC Comics: Longwood, Florida, 2003. Unpaginated.
Holland, Steve. "The Lancashire Cowboy and the Bloodhound: The Art of Denis McLoughlin," Paperback Parade #24 (June, 1991), 60–62.
Holland, Steve. The Mushroom Jungle. Zeon Books: Dilton Marsh, England, 1993.
Lesser, Thomas M. "The Boardman Hardcovers," Paperback Parade #38 (April, 1994), 21–44.

Mystery novels by series